McCracken County is a county located in the far western portion of U.S. state of Kentucky. As of the 2020 census, the population was 67,875. The county seat and only municipality is Paducah. McCracken County was the 78th county formed in the state, having been created in 1825. It is part of the historic Jackson Purchase, territory sold by the Chickasaw people to General Andrew Jackson and Governor Isaac Shelby; this territory was located at the extreme western end of Kentucky.

Paducah developed based on its "River and Rail" traffic. Steamboats, barges, and the Illinois Central Railroad were the basis of the economy into the late 20th century. In the 1920s, the Illinois Central built the largest operating and maintenance base in the world here. 

In the 21st century, McCracken County is part of the Paducah, KY-IL Micropolitan Statistical Area.

History
McCracken County was founded in 1825 from Hickman County; it was named for Captain Virgil McCracken of Woodford County, Kentucky, who was killed in the Battle of Frenchtown in southeastern Michigan during the War of 1812.

The Battle of Paducah occurred during the American Civil War in McCracken County on March 25, 1864. The skirmish between the Union and Confederate troops ended in a Confederate victory. A total of 140 men were killed during the battle.

In addition to having an economy influenced by river traffic, the county's economy was strengthened by construction of the railroad to Paducah. The railroads based operations and maintenance in Paducah, and the men in many families had careers as firemen, repairment, and related jobs.

Law and government
Federal

McCracken County makes up Kentucky's 1st congressional district and elects a representative to the US Congress. 

State

In the Kentucky General Assembly, McCracken is represented by the entirety of District 3 representing Paducah; a portion of District 2 representing the south of the county and Graves County; most of the county outside of Paducah by District 1, which encompasses counties of Ballard, Carlisle, Hickman and Fulton along the Mississippi River; and a tiny sliver of the east of McCracken County near Reidland is represented by the 6th District (centered on Marshall and Lyon counties).

In the State Senate, all of McCracken County is represented by the 2nd District and its State Senator Danny Carroll (R).

County

The county is led by an elected County Judge Executive, Craig Clymer, and three commissioners elected from single-member districts.

Geography
The county's northern border with Illinois is formed by the Ohio River, and its northeastern border by the Tennessee River.

Adjacent counties
 Massac County, Illinois (north)
 Livingston County (northeast)
 Marshall County (east)
 Graves County (south)
 Carlisle County (southwest)
 Ballard County (west)

National protected area
 Clarks River National Wildlife Refuge (part)

Demographics

As of the census of 2000, there were 65,514 people, 27,736 households, and 18,444 families residing in the county. The racial makeup of the county was 86.76% White, 10.88% Black or African American, 0.22% Native American, 0.51% Asian, 0.05% Pacific Islander, 0.40% from other races, and 1.18% from two or more races. Hispanic or Latino of any race were 1.06% of the population.

There were 27,736 households, out of which 29.60% had children under the age of 18 living with them, 51.10% were married couples living together, 12.20% had a female householder with no husband present, and 33.50% were non-families. 29.70% of all households were made up of individuals, and 12.30% had someone living alone who was 65 years of age or older. The average household size was 2.31 and the average family size was 2.86.

In the county, the population was spread out, with 23.40% under the age of 18, 7.90% from 18 to 24, 28.10% from 25 to 44, 24.70% from 45 to 64, and 15.90% who were 65 years of age or older. The median age was 39 years. For every 100 females, there were 90.50 males. For every 100 females age 18 and over, there were 86.30 males.

The median income for a household in the county was $33,865, and the median income for a family was $42,513. Males had a median income of $36,417 versus $22,704 for females. The per capita income for the county was $19,533. About 11.40% of families and 15.10% of the population were below the poverty line, including 21.90% of those under age 18 and 12.30% of those age 65 or over.

Education
Public elementary and secondary education in the county is provided by two school districts:
 McCracken County Public Schools, which serves the entire county except for the bulk of the city of Paducah, served by:
 Paducah Public Schools

Several private schools also provide K-12 education.  These institutions include the St. Mary System and Community Christian Academy.

Higher education is provided by West Kentucky Community and Technical College in Paducah, part of the Kentucky Community and Technical College System. Like all other schools in this system, WKCTC offers associate degrees. The state's largest public university, the University of Kentucky, operates a branch campus of its College of Engineering at WKCTC. Murray State University offers bachelor's degree programs and master's degrees. A new 43,000 square foot facility located on a 23-acre campus adjacent to WKCTC was opened in 2014. In addition, Lindsey Wilson College offers a human services degree at WKCTC and McKendree University operates a Bachelor of Science in Nursing degree program.

Communities

City
 Paducah (county seat)

Census-designated places
 Farley (formerly Woodlawn-Oakdale)
 Hendron
 Massac
 Reidland

Unincorporated communities

 Camelia
 Cecil
 Cimota City
 Freemont
 Future City
 Grahamville
 Hardmoney
 Heath
 Hovekamp
 Krebs
 Lone Oak
 Maxon
 Melber (partly in Graves County)
 Ragland
 Rossington
 Rudolph
 Saint Johns
 Sheehan Bridge
 West Paducah

Politics

See also

 National Register of Historic Places listings in McCracken County, Kentucky

References

External links
 McCracken County government's website
 McCracken County Sheriff

 
Kentucky counties
Kentucky counties on the Ohio River
Paducah micropolitan area
1825 establishments in Kentucky
Populated places established in 1825